This article is the discography of British jazz-funk band Shakatak.

Albums

Studio albums

Live albums

Compilation albums

Repackaged sets

Video albums

Singles

Notes

References 

Discographies of British artists

Jazz discographies